Maria Sharapova was the defending champion, but did not participate.

Daniela Hantuchová won the title, defeating Patty Schnyder in the final 6–4, 6–2.

Seeds

  Anna Chakvetadze (quarterfinals)
  Daniela Hantuchová (champion)
  Marion Bartoli (semifinals)
  Dinara Safina (quarterfinals)
  Nicole Vaidišová (semifinals)
  Patty Schnyder (finals)
  Tatiana Golovin (first round)
  Sybille Bammer (first round)

Draws

Key
Q – Qualifier
WC – Wild Card

Finals

Section 1

Section 2

External links
 Singles Draw

Generali Ladies Linz